Triunia montana, or mountain spice bush, is a shrub of the family Proteaceae native to Queensland.

References

Flora of Queensland
montana
Plants described in 1933